Wolverhampton South East is a borough constituency represented in the House of Commons of the Parliament of the United Kingdom. It elects one Member of Parliament (MP) by the first past the post system of election.

Members of Parliament

Boundaries 

Wolverhampton South East is one of three constituencies in the city of Wolverhampton, covering eastern and south-eastern parts of the city.  The constituency includes the town of Bilston.

The boundaries run south from the city centre towards Blakenhall and Goldthorn Park, and east towards Willenhall.  Since the 2010 general election, it has also included a small part of the Metropolitan Borough of Dudley.

2010–present: The City of Wolverhampton wards of Bilston East, Bilston North, Blakenhall, East Park, Ettingshall, and Spring Vale, and the Metropolitan Borough of Dudley ward of Coseley East.

1983–2010: The Metropolitan Borough of Wolverhampton wards of Bilston East, Bilston North, Blakenhall, East Park, Ettingshall, and Spring Vale.

1974–1983: The County Borough of Wolverhampton wards of Bilston East, Bilston North, Blakenhall, Ettingshall, Parkfield, and Spring Vale.

History 
The constituency was established in 1974, in part replacing the former Bilston constituency. It has returned Labour MPs throughout its existence, thus making it unique amongst Wolverhampton's three current constituencies. Robert Edwards of the Labour and Co-operative parties, who had represented Bilston since 1955, was the constituency's first MP.  He served until 1987, when he was succeeded by Dennis Turner (also Labour Co-operative), who stood down in 2005.  Pat McFadden of the Labour Party has been the MP since then. Following the 2019 general election, it is the only one of the three Wolverhampton seats to be held by Labour. The last time this was the case was in the 1987-92 Parliament, when the same two of the three Wolverhampton seats were Conservative-held.

Elections

Elections in the 2010s

Elections in the 2000s

Elections in the 1990s

Elections in the 1980s

Elections in the 1970s

See also 
 List of Members of Parliament for Wolverhampton
 List of parliamentary constituencies in Wolverhampton
 List of parliamentary constituencies in the West Midlands (county)

References

External links 
 United Kingdom Election Results
 United Kingdom General Election results since 1832

Parliamentary constituencies in Wolverhampton
Parliamentary constituencies in the West Midlands (county)
Constituencies of the Parliament of the United Kingdom established in 1974